Pencader Junction railway station served the village of Pencader, Carmarthenshire, Wales, from 1866 to 1880 on the Manchester and Milford Railway.

History
The station was opened on 1 January 1866 by the Manchester and Milford Railway. It was situated 300 yards west of the B4459. It closed in May 1880 as that was when it was last in the timetables.

References

Disused railway stations in Carmarthenshire
Railway stations in Great Britain opened in 1866
Railway stations in Great Britain closed in 1880
1866 establishments in Wales
1880s disestablishments in Wales